The Banjo Paterson Writing Award is an Australian literary award honouring the legacy of Australian writer Andrew Barton Paterson (1864-1941) and is awarded annually in the categories of prose, poetry and children’s writing.  The Banjo Paterson Writing Award is separate from the now-defunct National Book Council Banjo Award.

References

External links 
Listing of recipients of the Banjo Paterson Writing Award

Awards established in 1991
English-language literary awards
Short story awards
Australian poetry awards
Children's literary awards
Australian fiction awards